Herbert Meyer (born 12 June 1948, in Bremen) is a German former footballer who made a total of 201 appearances in the Bundesliga during his playing career.

References

External links
 

1948 births
Living people
Footballers from Bremen
German footballers
Association football defenders
Bundesliga players
2. Bundesliga players
SV Werder Bremen players
Kickers Offenbach players
Hannover 96 players
Borussia Dortmund players